Tina Alexandria Charles (born December 5, 1988) is an American professional basketball player for the Seattle Storm of the Women's National Basketball Association (WNBA). Originally from Jamaica, Queens, New York City, Charles was drafted first overall in the 2010 WNBA draft by the Connecticut Sun. In 2009 and 2010, she and teammate Maya Moore led the Connecticut Huskies to two undefeated national championships. She has won three Olympic gold medals with Team USA.

High school
Charles played basketball at Christ the King High School in Middle Village, New York. After averaging 26.5 points, 14.8 rebounds and 5.2 blocked shots per game her senior year, she was named WBCA National Player of the Year, "Miss Basketball" for New York state, and was selected as a McDonald's All-American and tabbed New York City Player of the Year by Newsday, the Daily News and the New York Post. Charles was the leading scorer on the Christ the King team that won 57 consecutive games, leading to a USA Today #1 ranking in the country after an undefeated season in 2006. Charles was named a WBCA All-American. She participated in the 2006 WBCA High School All-America Game, where she scored fifteen points and had twelve rebounds.
Charles was named the MVP of the Red team. During high school, Charles also played on the AAU club basketball team the New York Gazelles.

College
In 2009, Charles led the UConn Huskies to a national title as a junior. She was named Final Four MOP and one of the 10 players on the State Farm All-America team during Final Four weekend.
Charles made a comment to ESPN during a post-championship interview, in regards to the tradition of sports champions who visit the White House after their title game victories. She said, "Barack Obama, we will be here soon!" and after the 2010 championship she made a comment, "President Barack Obama, we're back!"

On February 13, 2010, before the game vs. St. John's, Charles became the 12th UConn Women's basketball player to be recognized in the Huskies of Honor and was the 2nd player to be honored while still a player.  The first was Renee Montgomery the year before.

On March 1, 2010, during a game against Notre Dame, Charles broke two UConn records on the same night. Her fifth rebound made her the all-time leading rebounder at UConn, surpassing Rebecca Lobo's fifteen-year-old record of 1268. Lobo was present working as a commentator for ESPN, and interviewed Charles after the game.  Additionally, Charles started the night in third place in career scoring, behind Kerry Bascom and Nykesha Sales. Sales had scored 2,178 points and Bascom 2,177 in their careers. During the game, Charles surpassed both to become the leading scorer in UConn history.

Charles was named the Big East Conference Player of the Year for 2010.

Charles majored in psychology with a minor in criminal justice. She anticipates working in corrections at the close of her basketball career. In 2010, she spent six hours a week as an intern at Bergin Correctional Institution, helping prisoners adjust back to life in society.

WNBA

Connecticut Sun
Charles was the overall #1 pick in the 2010 WNBA draft, selected by the Connecticut Sun.

Charles was named the 2010 WNBA Rookie of the Year. In her first season, she set all-time league records for rebounds, with 398 (a record that has since been broken by Jonquel Jones in 2017), and double-doubles with 22. (both scoring and rebounds in double digits).

On September 2, 2011, Tina Charles had 10 points, 10 assists and 16 rebounds for the first triple-double in Connecticut Sun history, and only the fifth such accomplishment in WNBA history. Charles had eight assists at halftime, and was taken out of the game with nine, because the lead over the opponent was so large. The coach did put her back in the game in the fourth quarter, and she earned an assist on a pass to Jessica Moore, leading to the triple double. However, subsequent review by the league resulted in a change, as three of the assists should not have been credited to Charles, so she ended the game with seven assists, not ten.

On August 18, 2012, Charles recorded nine rebounds in an 85–74 win over the Liberty. One of the rebounds in the second quarter pushed her career total to 1,000. She accomplished this milestone faster than any other WNBA player in history. She reached 1,000 rebounds in her 89th game, surpassing the record formerly held by Yolanda Griffith, who reached 1,000 rebounds in her 92nd game.

Charles was named the 2012 MVP of the WNBA, winning 25 of 41 first place votes. She led the league in the number of double-doubles recorded, and set the mark for the fastest player in WNBA history to reach 900, 1,000 and 1,100 rebounds.

New York Liberty
In the weeks leading up to the 2014 WNBA draft, rumors had circulated that Charles could be traded before the draft, so the Sun could obtain more draft picks. Just before the Draft, Charles was traded to her native team the New York Liberty in exchange for Kelsey Bone, the fourth overall pick in the 2014 WNBA draft (Alyssa Thomas) and the fourth overall pick in the 2015 WNBA draft (Elizabeth Williams).

In 2016, Charles had the best season of her career, averaging a career-high 21.5 points per game while shooting 43.9% from the field and 81.2% from the free-throw line. Charles had also led the league in rebounds with 9.9 rebounds per game, winning her fourth rebounding title. Her scoring average was tied with Elena Delle Donne but led the league in total points scored which allowed her to claim the scoring title. The Liberty finished with a 21–13 record. With the WNBA's new playoff format in effect, the Liberty were the number 3 seed in the league with a bye to the second round with one elimination game to play where they were defeated by the Phoenix Mercury.

In 2017, Charles would be voted into the 2017 WNBA All-Star Game making it her fifth career all-star game appearance. On June 2, 2017, Charles scored a career-high 36 points in a 93–89 win over the Dallas Wings. The Liberty would once again finish with number 3 seed in the league, receiving a bye to the second round elimination game. The Liberty would lose yet again in the second round by a final score of 82–69 to the Washington Mystics.

In 2018, Charles re-signed with the Liberty. In 2018, Charles would be voted into the 2018 WNBA All-Star Game for her sixth all-star game appearance. The Liberty would miss out on the playoffs for the first time in 4 years as they finished 7–27.

On June 4, 2019, Charles became the Liberty's all-time scoring leader after a late-fourth quarter layup in a 78–73 loss to the Los Angeles Sparks. She finished the game with 21 points and 14 rebounds.

Washington Mystics
On April 15, 2020, Charles was traded to the Washington Mystics. Charles was medically excused for the shortened 2020 season on July 17, 2020, due to her condition with extrinsic asthma, which impacts her immune system and put her at risk in the coronavirus pandemic.

Since 2013, Charles has donated her full WNBA salary to the charity she started, Hopey's Heart Foundation. In 2020, Charles announced she would direct that year's salary to support the Black Lives Matter movement. After two seasons with the Mystics - one sitting out in 2020 - Charles and the Mystics did not re-sign with each other during the 2022 offseason.

Phoenix Mercury
On February 4, 2022, Charles signed with the Phoenix Mercury. Charles joined the Mercury in hopes of winning a title, but the team struggled and wasn't in title contention through the first 18 games of the 2022 season. On June 25, 2022, Charles and the Mercury agreed to a buyout from her contract - officially ending her time in Phoenix. Charles appeared in 16 games for the Mercury and averaged 17.3 points.

Seattle Storm
Charles signed with the Seattle Storm on June 28, 2022.

Overseas
In the 2011–12 off-season, Charles played in Turkey for Galatasaray. From 2012 to 2014, Charles played two off-seasons in Poland for Wisła Can-Pack Kraków. In the 2014–15 off-season, Charles played in Turkey once again for Fenerbahçe. In the 2015–16 off-season, Charles played in China for the Xinjiang Tianshan Deers. As of November 2016, Charles had signed with the Sichuan Whales for the 2016–17 off-season. In 2017, Charles had re-signed with the Sichuan Whales for the 2017–18 off-season.

USA Basketball
Charles was a member of the USA Women's U18 team which won the gold medal at the FIBA Americas Championship in Colorado Springs, Colorado. The event was held in July 2006, when the USA team defeated Canada to win the championship. Charles helped set the tone in the opening game against Paraguay, recording a double-double with 20 points and 10 rebounds. In the gold medal game, she had her second double-double of the tournament with 13 points and 13 rebounds. She was the leading scorer on her team with 12 points per games, as well as the leading rebounder, with 9.5 per game.

Charles was invited to the USA Basketball Women's National Team training camp in the fall of 2009, one of only three college players invited to the training camp. The team selected to play for the 2010 FIBA World Championship and the 2012 Olympics is usually chosen from these participants.

Charles was named a member of the team representing the US at the 2009 World University Games held in Belgrade, Serbia. The team won all seven games to earn the gold medal. Charles was the team's leading scorer and rebounder, with 16.1 points per game and 8.1 rebounds per game. In the gold medal game against previously undefeated Russia, she had 28 points and 18 rebounds.

On October 5, 2009, Charles was selected to be one of the USA National Team members to travel to the 2009 Ekaterinburg International Invitational. She was the only college player on the team.  Charles contributed to the USA Basketball win at the Ekaterinburg Tournament. She had double-digit scoring in all three games, with the second game, against  Euroleasing Sopron, her best result, scoring 15 points in only 13 minutes of play.

Charles was named the USA Basketball 2009 Female Athlete Of The Year, for her contributions to the Gold Medal earned at the 2009 USA Women's World University Games, the Gold Medal earned at the 2009 Ekaterinburg International Invitational, and the undefeated collegiate season leading to a National Championship.

Charles was named as one of the  National team members to represent the USA Basketball team in the WNBA versus USA Basketball. This game replaces the normal WNBA All-Star game with WNBA All-Stars versus USA Basketball, as part of the preparation for the FIBA World Championship for Women to be held in the Czech Republic during September and October 2010.

Charles was selected to be a member of the National team representing the US at the World Championships held in September and October 2010. The team was coached by Geno Auriemma. Because many team members were still playing in the WNBA until just prior to the event, the team had only one day of practice with the entire team before leaving for Ostrava and Karlovy Vary, Czech Republic. Even with limited practice, the team managed to win its first games against Greece by 26 points. The team continued to dominate with victory margins exceeding 20 points in the first five games. Several players shared scoring  honors, with Swin Cash, Angel McCoughtry, Maya Moore, Diana Taurasi, Lindsay Whalen, and Sylvia Fowles all ending as high scorer in the first few games. The sixth game was against undefeated Australia — the USA jumped out to a 24-point lead and the USA prevailed 83–75. The USA won its next two games by over 30 points, then faced the host team, the Czech Republic, in the championship game. The USA team had only a five-point lead at halftime, which was cut to three points, but the Czechs never got closer. Team USA went on to win the championship and gold medal. Charles averaged 10.7 points per game, third best on the team and was the second leading rebounder with 4.8 per game.

Charles played for Team USA at the 2012 Summer Olympics in London. Charles would earn her first olympic gold medal as they beat France 86–50 for the gold medal.

Charles played for Team USA during the 2016 Summer Olympics, helping them win their sixth gold medal as they defeated Spain 101–72. Charles would earn her second olympic gold medal.

Career statistics

WNBA

Regular season

|-
| align="left" | 2010
| align="left" | Connecticut
| 34 || 34 || 31.0 || .487 || .000 || .763 || style="background:#D3D3D3"|11.7° || 1.5 || 0.7 || 1.7 || 2.1 || 15.5
|-
| align="left" | 2011
| align="left" | Connecticut
| 34 || 34 || 33.4 || .468 || .000 || .687 || style="background:#D3D3D3"|11.0° || 1.9 || 0.8 || 1.8 || 2.2 || 17.6
|-
| align="left" | 2012
| align="left" | Connecticut
| 33 || 33 || 33.2 || .499 || .200 || .802 || style="background:#D3D3D3"|10.5° || 1.7 || 0.5 || 1.4 || 2.2 || 18.0
|-
| align="left" | 2013
| align="left" | Connecticut
| 29 || 29 || 32.8 || .400 || .000 || .752 || 10.1 || 1.4 || 0.9 || 0.9 || 2.2 || 18.0
|-
| align="left" | 2014
| align="left" | New York
| 34 || 34 || 32.9 || .462 || .000 || .752 || 9.4 || 2.2 || 1.2 || 0.8 || 2.3 || 17.4
|-
| align="left" | 2015
| align="left" | New York
| 34 || 34 || 31.0 || .458 || .200 || .715 || 8.5 ||2.4 || 0.7 || 0.6 || 2.4 || 17.4
|-
| align="left" | 2016
| align="left" | New York
| 32 || 32 || 33.7 || .439 || .347  || .812  || style="background:#D3D3D3"|9.9° || 3.8 || 0.8 || 0.7 || 2.0 || style="background:#D3D3D3"|21.5°
|-
| align="left" | 2017
| align="left" | New York
| 34 || 34 || 32.2 || .442 || .348  || .804  || 9.4 || 2.6 || 0.8 || 0.7 || 2.4 || 19.7
|-
| align="left" | 2018
| align="left" | New York
| 33 || 33 || 33.0 || .473 || .326  || .770  || 7.0 || 2.7 || 0.7 || 0.6 || 2.8 || 19.7
|-
| align="left" | 2019
| align="left" | New York
| 33 || 33 || 31.2 || .389 || .186  || .812  || 7.5 || 2.4 || 0.7 || 0.9 || 2.6 || 16.9
|-
| align="left" | 2021
| align="left" | Washington
| 27 || 27 || 33.3 || .449 || .365  || .820 || 9.6 || 2.1 || 0.9 || 0.9 || 2.2 || style="background:#D3D3D3"|23.4°
|-
| align="left" | 2022
| align="left" | Phoenix
| 16 || 16 || 33.1 || .441 || .364 || .800 || 7.3 || 2.1 || 0.8 || 0.8 || 2.4 || 17.3
|-
| align="left" | 2022
| align="left" | Seattle
| 18 || 10 || 25.2 || .477 || .341 || .885 || 7.4 || 1.8 || 0.6 || 0.6 || 1.9 || 12.6
|-
| align="left" | Career
| align="left" | 12 years, 5 teams
| 391 || 383 || 32.3 || .450 || .325 || .775 || 9.3 || 2.2 || 0.8 || 1.0 || 2.3 || 18.2

Playoffs

|-
| align="left" | 2011
| align="left" | Connecticut
| 2 || 2 || 36.0 || .313 || .000 || .625 || style="background:#D3D3D3"|12.0° || 2.0 || 1.0 || style="background:#D3D3D3"|2.5° || 2.0 || 12.5
|-
| align="left" | 2012
| align="left" | Connecticut
| 5 || 5 || 36.0 || .469 || .500 || 696 || 10.0 || 1.0 || 0.8 || style="background:#D3D3D3"|2.6° || 1.8 || 18.6
|-
| align="left" | 2015
| align="left" | New York
| 6 || 6 || 38.3 || .434 || .500 || .789 || 8.7 || 4.0 || 0.1 || 0.6 || 2.0 || 20.3
|-
| align="left" | 2016
| align="left" | New York
| 1 || 1 || 36.4 || .417 || .333 || 1.000 || 9.0 || 5.0 || 1.0 || 0.0 || 1.0 || 19.0
|-
| style="text-align:left;"| 2017
| style="text-align:left;"| New York
| 1 || 1 || 36.2 || .471|| .500 || .500 || 6.0 || 1.0 || 0.0|| 0.0 || 2.0 || 18.0
|-
| style="text-align:left;"| 2022
| style="text-align:left;"| Seattle
| 6 || 6 || 26.2 || .431 || .231 || .286 || 8.8 || 1.8 || 0.5 || 0.5 || 1.3 || 11.5
|-
| align="left" | Career
| align="left" | 6 years, 3 teams
| 21 || 21 || 33.9 || .432 || .318 || .662 || 9.2 || 2.4 || 0.5 || 1.2 || 1.7 || 16.5

College

Awards and honors
 2006 USA Today National Player of the Year
 2006 McDonald's National Player of the Year
 2006 Parade Magazine National Player of the Year
 2006 Gatorade National Player of the Year
 2006 WBCA National Player of the Year
 2006 EA Sports National Player of the Year
 2006 Miss New York Basketball
 2007 Big East Freshman of the Year
 2009 USA Basketball Female Athlete of the Year
 2010 All-BIG EAST First Team (unanimous)
 2010 Big East Player of the Year
 2010 AP All-America First Team
 2010 U.S. Basketball Writers Association's Player of the Year.
 2010 State Farm Coaches' All-America Team
 2010 #1 selection in 2010 WNBA draft
 2010 John R. Wooden Award winner
 2010 WNBA Rookie of the Year
 2010 All-WNBA Second Team
 2012 WNBA MVP

Personal life
Charles has established a foundation, named Hopey's Heart Foundation, to distribute  Automated External Defibrillators (AED) to schools. Charles has also funded a school in Mali.  In 2018, Charles was awarded the Mannie Jackson Basketball's Human Spirit Award for her work on education and heart health.

See also
 List of WNBA career rebounding leaders
 Connecticut Huskies women's basketball
 List of Connecticut Huskies women's basketball players with 1000 points
 List of Connecticut Huskies women's basketball players with 1000 rebounds
 2008–09 Connecticut Huskies women's basketball team
 2009–10 Connecticut Huskies women's basketball team

References

External links

Heart of Hope Foundation

1988 births
Living people
All-American college women's basketball players
American expatriate basketball people in China
American expatriate basketball people in Poland
American expatriate basketball people in Turkey
American women's basketball players
Basketball players at the 2012 Summer Olympics
Basketball players at the 2016 Summer Olympics
Basketball players at the 2020 Summer Olympics
Basketball players from New York City
Beijing Great Wall players
Centers (basketball)
Connecticut Sun draft picks
Connecticut Sun players
Fenerbahçe women's basketball players
Galatasaray S.K. (women's basketball) players
Medalists at the 2009 Summer Universiade
Medalists at the 2012 Summer Olympics
Medalists at the 2016 Summer Olympics
Medalists at the 2020 Summer Olympics
New York Liberty players
Olympic gold medalists for the United States in basketball
Parade High School All-Americans (girls' basketball)
People from Jamaica, Queens
Phoenix Mercury players
Sportspeople from Queens, New York
UConn Huskies women's basketball players
Universiade gold medalists for the United States
Universiade medalists in basketball
Washington Mystics players
Women's National Basketball Association All-Stars
Women's National Basketball Association first-overall draft picks
Xinjiang Magic Deer players
United States women's national basketball team players